H1, H-1, H01, H I may refer to:

Places

Interstate H-1, a highway in Hawaii
 Area H1, the area of Hebron controlled by the Palestinian Authority under the Hebron Protocol

Science
 H1 (particle detector)
 Histamine H1 receptor
 Histone H1, a protein

 British NVC community H1, a heath zone
 Hydrogen atom (H1)
 Protium (isotope), an isotope of hydrogen
 H I region, a cloud in the interstellar medium
 ATC code H01 Pituitary and hypothalamic hormones and analogues, a subgroup of the Anatomical Therapeutic Chemical Classification System
 Haplogroup H1 (disambiguation), a grouping in genetics based on certain similarities
 Alternative hypothesis (H1)

Technology
 , level 1 heading markup for HTML Web pages; see HTML element
 DSC-H1, a Sony Cybershot digital camera
 H1, John Harrison's first marine chronometer
 Tianwen-1 (formerly Huoxing-1), first Chinese space probe to reach Mars
 H-1NF, the Australian Plasma Fusion Research Facility, formerly H-1 Heliac stellarator

Transportation
H1 Lamp, an automotive halogen light bulb
H-I or H–1, a Japanese rocket
Rocketdyne H-1, a liquid-propellant rocket engine

Aviation
Bell Huey family Bell H-1, series of helicopters with that designation
Hooters Air airline
Hughes H-1 Racer, a racing aircraft

Motor vehicles
 Haval H1, a Chinese subcompact crossover
 Hummer H1, an American full-size SUV
 Hyundai H-1, a South Korean commercial van
Tiger H1, a German heavy tank used during WW2

Motorcycles
Kawasaki H1 Mach III, road motorcycle
Kawasaki H1R, racing motorcycle

Ships
HMS H1, a 1915 British Royal Navy H-class submarine
HMS Hotspur (H01), a 1935 British Royal Navy H-class destroyer
USS H-1, a 1913 United States Navy submarine

Rail
LB&SCR H1 class, a class of British steam locomotives
LNER Class H1, a class of British steam locomotives
Designation for METRORail Siemens S70 light rail vehicles

Time
H1 may refer to the first half of the business year, while H2 refers to the second half.

Other uses
 H1 (classification), a para-cycling classification
 , one of the three laryngeals in the reconstructed Proto-Indo-European language
H1 Unlimited, a premier unlimited hydroplane racing league 
Hora Um da Notícia, a news program aired by Rede Globo

See also

 Hello Internet (HI), a podcast
 H-1B visa
 HI (disambiguation)
 HL (disambiguation)
 1H (disambiguation)
 H (disambiguation)
 1 (disambiguation)